The 2015 ESPY Awards was the annual ESPY Awards held annually with 32 awards in total being handed out, honoring the best in sports. They were presented on July 15, 2015 and hosted by actor and comedian Joel McHale from the Microsoft Theater in Downtown Los Angeles. For the first time in its 23-year history, the ceremony was broadcast on ABC.

Winners and nominees
Winners are listed first and highlighted in boldface.

Honorary awards

Arthur Ashe Courage Award
Caitlyn Jenner

Jimmy V Perseverance Award
Leah and Devon Still

Pat Tillman Award for Service
Danielle Green

Best Moment
Lauren Hill, specifically her first game in November 2014

Icon Award
Derek Jeter

Presenters
The following are a list of presenters in order of appearance:

 Kiefer Sutherland
 Rachel McAdams
 Richard Sherman
 Lindsey Vonn
 Halle Berry
 Robin Roberts
 Mike Epps
 Alex Morgan
 Stephen Curry
 J. J. Watt
 Britney Spears
 Ed Helms
 Danica Patrick
 LeBron James
 Ciara
 Andre Iguodala
 Ben Affleck
 Abby Wambach
 Jake Gyllenhaal
 Brett Favre
 Vince Vaughn

In Memoriam
The In Memoriam was first presented by journalist Robin Roberts giving tribute to fellow sports broadcaster Stuart Scott followed by singer Nate Ruess singing his single Moment to a video montage and honoring the following:

 Lauren Hill
 Ernie Banks
 Rob Bironas
 Oscar Taveras
 Dean Smith
 Chuck Bednarik
 Garo Yepremian
 Steve Montador 
 Steve Byrnes
 Ann Mara
 Jerry Tarkanian
 Charles Sifford
 Minnie Miñoso
 Jerome Kersey
 Jethro Pugh
 Bob St. Clair
 Frank Borghi
 Roy Tarpley
 Marques Haynes 
 Bevo Francis
 Rhonda Glenn
 Viktor Tikonov
 Calvin Peete
 Frank Torre
 Jean Béliveau
 Fuzzy Thurston
 Marty Sheets
 Ed Sabol
 Anthony Mason
 Ken Stabler
 Ernie Terrell
 Jack Kraft
 Allie Sherman
 Bill Guthridge
 Hot Rod Hundley
 Stuart Scott

References

External links
 Official website
 Complete list of nominees

2015
ESPY
ESPY
ESPY
ESPY